Aroon Kumar a/l Ramaloo (born 18 March 1994) is a Malaysian professional footballer who plays as a right-back for Negeri Sembilan FC. He also can operates as a centre-back and midfielder.

Career 
He started his football career for the senior team in 2016 after being promoted to the Negeri Sembilan first team. He has been with the Negeri Sembilan team for 4 years and has made 2 appearances. He was transferred to Petaling Jaya City FC in 2020.

He returned and signed a contract with Negeri Sembilan FC in 2021. He has made 17 appearances while with Negeri Sembilan FC. After spending only one season with Negeri Sembilan FC, he was transferred to Petaling Jaya City FC in 2022.

In 2023 he returned to join the team Negeri Sembilan FC on a free transfer after spent 4 years with the team in 2016-2019 and 1 year in 2021. He was officially announced as a new Negeri Sembilan FC player on January 9, 2023.

Personal life
Aroon has a brother, Barathkumar, who is also a professional footballer.

References

External links 

1994 births
Living people
Malaysian footballers
Malaysia Premier League players
Malaysia Super League players
Negeri Sembilan FA players
Petaling Jaya City FC players
Negeri Sembilan FC players
Malaysian people of Tamil descent
Malaysian sportspeople of Indian descent
Association football fullbacks
Association football wingers
People from Negeri Sembilan